Paulsboro is a borough in Gloucester County, in the U.S. state of New Jersey. As of the 2020 United States census, the borough's population was 6,196, an increase of 99 (+1.6%) from the 2010 census count of 6,097, which in turn reflected a decline of 63 (−1.0%) from the 6,160 counted in the 2000 census. 

Paulsboro was formed as a borough by an act of the New Jersey Legislature on March 2, 1904, from portions of Greenwich Township. It was named for Samuel Phillip Paul, son of a settler.

History

Paulsboro is the home of Fort Billingsport, the first land purchase made by the United States, acquired the day after the signing of the United States Declaration of Independence.

Paulsboro is the location of the Tinicum Island Rear Range Light house, first lit on the night of December 31, 1880. In 1997, a local citizens' group was established with the purpose of providing tours and public access to the structure. The lighthouse is one of New Jersey's few publicly accessible aids to navigation and is the centerpiece of Paulsboro's cultural revitalization.

The East Jefferson Street railroad bridge over Mantua Creek was built in 1917 and rebuilt in 1940 for the Pennsylvania-Reading Seashore Lines (PRSL). It is now part of Conrail's Penns Grove Secondary. On November 30, 2012, it buckled, causing seven cars of a freight train to derail. One of the four tanker cars that fell into the creek was punctured, leaking thousands of gallons of vinyl chloride. Homes in the borough had to be evacuated and dozens of people went to hospitals as a precautionary measure due to exposure to the chemicals. Some residents in the area have filed suit against Conrail and CSX in Pennsylvania State Court having "complained about respiratory and bronchial related illnesses, headaches, eye and skin irritations and multiple other symptoms." In March 2013, Conrail announced that the bridge would be replaced with an expected September 2014 operational date. Normally, between March 1 and November 30 the bridge is left in the open position for maritime traffic and closed when trains approach. It will remain locked in the closed position until the bridge is replaced. In September 2013, another less serious derailment took place along the border of Gibbstown (in Greenwich Township) and Paulsboro, with one car leaving the tracks on a train consisting mostly of empty tanker cars.

Geography
According to the U.S. Census Bureau, the borough had a total area of 2.63 square miles (6.81 km2), including 1.92 square miles (4.98 km2) of land and 0.71 square miles (1.83 km2) of water (26.81%).

Unincorporated communities, localities and place names located partially or completely within the borough include Billingsport.

Paulsboro borders the Gloucester County municipalities of East Greenwich Township, Greenwich Township, and West Deptford Township. It also borders the Delaware River.

Demographics

2010 census

The Census Bureau's 2006–2010 American Community Survey showed that (in 2010 inflation-adjusted dollars) median household income was $43,846 (with a margin of error of +/− $9,449) and the median family income was $61,147 (+/− $5,392). Males had a median income of $51,923 (+/− $6,640) versus $37,826 (+/− $5,863) for females. The per capita income for the borough was $21,061 (+/− $2,252). About 8.2% of families and 12.9% of the population were below the poverty line, including 13.6% of those under age 18 and 9.9% of those age 65 or over.

2000 census
As of the 2000 census, there were 6,160 people, 2,353 households, and 1,614 families residing in the borough. The racial makeup of the borough was 63.56% White, 31.64% African American, 0.24% Native American, 0.32% Asian, 0.10% Pacific Islander, 1.31% from other races, and 2.82% from two or more races. Hispanic or Latino of any race were 4.35% of the population.

There were 2,353 households, out of which 33.1% had children under the age of 18 living with them, 38.0% were married couples living together, 24.7% had a female householder with no husband present, and 31.4% were non-families. 26.9% of all households were made up of individuals, and 11.6% had someone living alone who was 65 years of age or older. The average household size was 2.61 and the average family size was 3.15.

In the borough, the population was spread out, with 28.8% under the age of 18, 8.3% from 18 to 24, 29.8% from 25 to 44, 19.3% from 45 to 64, and 13.9% who were 65 years of age or older. The median age was 34 years. For every 100 females, there were 88.1 males. For every 100 females age 18 and over, there were 81.7 males.

The median income for a household in the borough was $35,569, and the median income for a family was $41,359. Males had a median income of $32,313 versus $24,779 for females. The per capita income for the borough was $16,368. About 14.6% of families and 17.7% of the population were below the poverty line, including 27.0% of those under age 18 and 9.2% of those age 65 or over.

Government

Local government
Paulsboro is governed under the Borough form of New Jersey municipal government, which is used in 218 municipalities (of the 564) statewide, making it the most common form of government in New Jersey. The governing body is comprised of a Mayor and a Borough Council, with all positions elected at-large on a partisan basis as part of the November general election. A Mayor is elected directly by the voters to a four-year term of office. The Borough Council is comprised of six members elected to serve three-year terms on a staggered basis, with two seats coming up for election each year in a three-year cycle. The Borough form of government used by Paulsboro is a "weak mayor / strong council" government in which council members act as the legislative body with the mayor presiding at meetings and voting only in the event of a tie. The mayor can veto ordinances subject to an override by a two-thirds majority vote of the council. The mayor makes committee and liaison assignments for council members, and most appointments are made by the mayor with the advice and consent of the council.

, the Mayor of the Borough of Paulsboro is Democrat Gary C. Stevenson, whose term of office ends December 31, 2023. Members of the Paulsboro Borough Council are Council President John A. Giovannitti (D, 2022), Karen Armistead (D, 2024), Eric DiTonno (D, 2022), Theodore D. Holloway II (D, 2023) and Joe L. Kidd (D, 2023) and Jennifer Turner (D, 2024).

Gary Stevenson was chosen in January 2012 to fill the vacant council seat of W. Jeffery Hamilton expiring in 2013, who left his seat after being sworn in as mayor. Alfonso Giampola was appointed in May 2012 to fill the vacant seat of Paul Morina for a term ending in 2014.

In January 2016, the Borough Council selected Eric DiTonno to fill the seat expiring in December 2016 that was vacated by Gary C. Stevenson when he took office as mayor.

In 2018, the borough had an average property tax bill of $3,997, the lowest in the county, compared to an average bill of $6,851 in Gloucester County and $8,767 statewide. The borough had the 21st-highest property tax rate in New Jersey, with an equalized rate of 4.427% in 2020, compared to 3.212% in the county as a whole and a statewide average of 2.279%.

Federal, state, and county representation
Paulsboro is located in the First Congressional District and is part of New Jersey's 3rd state legislative district.

Politics
As of March 2011, there were a total of 3,635 registered voters in Paulsboro, of which 1,866 (51.3%) were registered as Democrats, 251 (6.9%) were registered as Republicans and 1,516 (41.7%) were registered as Unaffiliated. There were 2 voters registered as either Libertarians or Greens.

In the 2012 presidential election, Democrat Barack Obama received 78.8% of the vote (1,945 cast), ahead of Republican Mitt Romney with 20.3% (501 votes), and other candidates with 0.9% (21 votes), among the 2,489 ballots cast by the borough's 3,817 registered voters (22 ballots were spoiled), for a turnout of 65.2%. In the 2008 presidential election, Democrat Barack Obama received 76.0% of the vote (2,059 cast), ahead of Republican John McCain with 21.6% (586 votes) and other candidates with 1.2% (33 votes), among the 2,708 ballots cast by the borough's 3,958 registered voters, for a turnout of 68.4%. In the 2004 presidential election, Democrat John Kerry received 71.6% of the vote (1,806 ballots cast), outpolling Republican George W. Bush with 27.4% (691 votes) and other candidates with 0.4% (16 votes), among the 2,524 ballots cast by the borough's 3,796 registered voters, for a turnout percentage of 66.5.

In the 2013 gubernatorial election, Democrat Barbara Buono received 55.0% of the vote (741 cast), ahead of Republican Chris Christie with 43.9% (592 votes), and other candidates with 1.0% (14 votes), among the 1,467 ballots cast by the borough's 3,630 registered voters (120 ballots were spoiled), for a turnout of 40.4%. In the 2009 gubernatorial election, Democrat Jon Corzine received 63.2% of the vote (1,031 ballots cast), ahead of Republican Chris Christie with 23.3% (381 votes), Independent Chris Daggett with 6.3% (102 votes) and other candidates with 0.7% (11 votes), among the 1,632 ballots cast by the borough's 3,814 registered voters, yielding a 42.8% turnout.

Education
The Paulsboro Public Schools serves students in pre-kindergarten through twelfth grade. As of the 2020–21 school year, the district, comprised of four schools, had an enrollment of 1,186 students and 101.0 classroom teachers (on an FTE basis), for a student–teacher ratio of 11.7:1. Schools in the district (with 2020–21 enrollment data from the National Center for Education Statistics) are Billingsport Early Childhood Center with 304 students in grades PreK-2, Loudenslager Elementary School with 351 students in grades 3-6, Paulsboro Junior High School with 131 students in grades 7-8, and Paulsboro High School with 351 students in grades 9-12.

Students in ninth through twelfth grades from Greenwich Township attend the district's high school as part of a sending/receiving relationship with the Greenwich Township School District.

Students from across the county are eligible to apply to attend Gloucester County Institute of Technology, a four-year high school in Deptford Township that provides technical and vocational education. As a public school, students do not pay tuition to attend the school.

The Roman Catholic Diocese of Camden oversees Guardian Angels Regional School, which has a 4–8 campus in Paulsboro while its Pre-K–3 campus is in Gibbstown. Its PreK-3 campus is in Gibbstown while its 4-8 campus is in Paulsboro.

Transportation

Roads and highways

Several major roadways pass through the borough. Interstate 295 and U.S. Route 130 pass through the southern tip of Paulsboro and Route 44 also traverses the borough.

Public transportation
NJ Transit bus service is available between Pennsville Township and Philadelphia on the 402 route, with local service offered on the 455 route between Cherry Hill Mall and Woodbury.

The borough operates shuttle bus service throughout the day.

Port of Paulsboro

The Port of Paulsboro is located on the Delaware River and Mantua Creek in and around Paulsboro. It is traditionally one of the nation's busiest for marine transfer operations of petroleum products. From 1998 to early 2011, the Valero Energy Corporation operated an oil refinery here, which it sold in a 2010 deal to PBF Energy for $360 million. The bridge over Mantua Creek was the site of the 2012 Paulsboro train derailment, resulting in a tank car leaking 23,000 gallons of vinyl chloride into the air.

The port is being redeveloped as an adaptable omniport able to handle a diversity of bulk, break bulk cargo and shipping containers. Studies completed in 2012 concluded that the port is well-suited to become a center for the manufacture, assembly, and transport of wind turbines and platforms for the development of Atlantic Wind Connection The port has also been home to America's largest asphalt refinery, scheduled to close in 2017.

Popular culture
The 2004 film Jersey Girl is set in the Jersey Shore community of Highlands but was filmed in Paulsboro.

Notable people

People who were born in, residents of, or otherwise closely associated with Paulsboro include:
 Flipper Anderson (born 1965 as Willie Lee Anderson Jr.), wide receiver who played in the NFL for nine seasons for four different teams
 John J. Burzichelli (born 1954), member of the New Jersey General Assembly who was also a long-time mayor of Paulsboro
 Russell Carter (born 1985), a First Team All-Big East basketball player at the University of Notre Dame in 2006–2007
 Julién Davenport (born 1995), offensive tackle for the Indianapolis Colts
 Gerald Hodges (born 1991), linebacker who has played in the NFL for the Minnesota Vikings
 Isaac F. Hughes (1861–1931), member of the Los Angeles City Council, 1925–1927
 Henry C. Loudenslager (1852–1911), represented New Jersey's 1st congressional district from 1893 to 1911
 Tony Montanaro (1927–2002), mime artist who switched to the art from stage acting after seeing Marcel Marceau's 1956 performances in New York City
 Isaac Redman (born 1984), running back for the Pittsburgh Steelers
 Kevin Ross (born 1962), Paulsboro High and Temple University graduate, played in the National Football League for 14 seasons for three different teams
 Anthony Scirrotto (born 1986), football safety
 Larry Sharpe (born 1951), former professional wrestler who operates the Monster Factory training school in Paulsboro
 Alex Silvestro (born 1988), tight end who has played in the NFL for the New England Patriots and Baltimore Ravens
 Edwin H. Simmons (1921–2007), highly decorated United States Marine Corps officer
 Joan Weber (1935–1981), singer who became a one-hit wonder with her 1954 song "Let Me Go, Lover!"
 Chazz Witherspoon (born 1981), professional boxer

References

External links

 Borough of Paulsboro website
 Paulsboro Public Schools
 
 School Data for the Paulsboro Public Schools, National Center for Education Statistics

 
1904 establishments in New Jersey
Borough form of New Jersey government
Boroughs in Gloucester County, New Jersey
New Jersey populated places on the Delaware River
Populated places established in 1904
Port cities and towns in New Jersey